Kabimoi is a settlement in Kenya's Baringo County in Eldama Ravine Sub-County. It is home to President Moi's Kabimoi Ranch where his wife Lena Moi lived until she died in 2004. Kabimoi High School is one of the popular secondary schools in the area.

Kabimoi is a relatively small township with a few shops mostly located on the Eldama Ravine - Nakuru Highway. The distance from Kabimoi to the headquarter town of Eldama Ravine is approximately 10 Kilometres.

Kabimoi is one of small towns  in baringo that is developing rapidly

Populated places in Baringo County